Yelan-Yelga (Yılanyılğa) is a rural locality (a village) in Starotumbagushevsky Selsoviet, Sharansky District, Bashkortostan, Russia. The population was 26 as of 2010. There is 1 street.

Geography 
Yelan-Yelga is located 14 km north of Sharan (the district's administrative centre) by road. Temyakovo is the nearest rural locality.

References 

Rural localities in Sharansky District